

Life and Career 
Joan Ann Rosazza was born in May 19, 1937 in Torrington, Connecticut where she was raised and where she was eventually taught to swim competitively. 

She is an American former competition swimmer and Olympic medalist.  She represented the United States as a 19-year-old at the 1956 Summer Olympics in Melbourne, Australia, where she won a silver medal in the women's 4×100-meter freestyle relay with Sylvia Ruuska, Shelley Mann and Nancy Simons.  Individually, she also competed in the women's 100-meter freestyle at the Olympics and finished fourth in the final.

Education 
Rosazza graduated from Purdue University in 1960 with a bachelor's degree in education.  She later attended Boston College, where she earned a master's degree in psychology and counseling. She then became a teacher for two schools, first at Winchester High School and then at Concord-Carlisle High School 

She received the Massachusetts Women in Athletics Distinguished Service Award in 1999.

See also
 List of Boston College people
 List of Olympic medalists in swimming (women)
 List of Purdue University people

References

External links
 

1937 births
Living people
American female freestyle swimmers
Boston College alumni
Olympic silver medalists for the United States in swimming
People from Torrington, Connecticut
Purdue University College of Education alumni
Sportspeople from the New York metropolitan area
Swimmers from Connecticut
Swimmers at the 1956 Summer Olympics
Medalists at the 1956 Summer Olympics
21st-century American women